= M. E. Sprengelmeyer =

American newspaper reporter

Michael E. Sprengelmeyer (who uses the byline M.E. Sprengelmeyer) is an American newspaper reporter. For the Rocky Mountain News, he covered the Iraq War and the 2008 US presidential campaign. At the time the Rocky closed (February 2009), he was its Washington, D.C. correspondent.

== Education ==
Sprengelmeyer obtained his degree from Northwestern University in 1989.

== Career ==
Sprengelmeyer worked in the Rocky's Washington bureau since 2001. In 2002, he traveled with the US Marines in the war in Afghanistan.

In August 2009, Sprengelmeyer bought the weekly New Mexico Guadalupe County Communicator and became its owner, publisher, editor, and primary writer.

== Personal ==
Outside from reporting, he was once a Wrigley Field usher, accordion player, and played in a band called "News Hole". Michael Sprengelmeyer became "M.E." twenty years ago when he realized that his full name would not fit in a column width.
